The 2008 Blue Square Greyhound Derby took place during May with the final held on 31 May 2008 at Wimbledon Stadium. The winner Loyal Honcho received £100,000.

Final result 
At Wimbledon (over 480 metres):

Distances 
3½, 1½, 5½, 1¾, Dis (lengths)
The distances between the greyhounds are in finishing order and shown in lengths. One length is equal to 0.08 of one second.

Race Report
It took five rounds of action to narrow down the field to the final six greyhounds that would for the final of the competition race over 480 m in a chance to win the 2008 English Greyhound Derby. After finishing second to Westmead Lord in 2007, Loyal Honcho won the 2008 title in his second attempt, dominating the final. Seamus Graham's runner, who was sent as the 5–2 joint-favourite along with fellow Irish raider Tyrur Laurel, took control of the race from the traps and pulled clear to beat Tyrur Kieran (11–4) and winner of the Scottish Greyhound Derby, by three and a half lengths in a respectable 28.60 sec (480 metres). A messy race saw five of the six contenders encounter trouble with Lenson Express falling and finishing last.

It was the first Irish trained success in the Derby since Ian Reilly's Droopys Scholes took the honours in 2004.

Quarter finals

Semi finals

See also 
2008 UK & Ireland Greyhound Racing Year

References

Results
Results and video of the race

External links
British Greyhound Racing Board
Greyhound Data

Greyhound Derby
English Greyhound Derby
English Greyhound Derby
English Greyhound Derby